Aaro Pranam is a 1997 Indian Telugu-language film directed by Veeru K and stars Vineeth and Soundarya.

Plot 
The film is about a relationship between a man, Chanti, and a woman, Akankshaa, who is one year older than the man. How they convince their relatives to accept their relationship forms the rest of the story.

Cast 
 Vineeth as Chanti
 Soundarya as Aakaanksha
 S. P. Balasubrahmanyam as Chanti's father
 Lakshmi 
 Bramhanandam
 Vadivelu
 Nassar as Yaswanth, Aakaanksha's father
 Raadhika as Aakaanksha's mother
 Nirmalamma
 Tanikella Bharani
 M. S. Narayana
 Babu Mohan

Production 
The film was shot at Annapurna Studios in Hyderabad. The film was initially planned as a bilingual, with a Tamil title of Kadallikkalam Vaa, but eventually was not made.

Soundtrack

Reception
A critic opined that "With a talented director like Veeru as the story writer and music director the movie is splendid, but the story is a slight let down".

Legacy 
The concept of a man dating an older woman is prevalent in the film Ye Maaya Chesave (Vinnaithaandi Varuvaayaa in Tamil).

Awards

References

External links 
 

1997 films
1990s Telugu-language films
1997 drama films
Indian drama films